Günther Schumacher (born 27 June 1949) is a retired track cyclist and road bicycle racer born in East Germany, who was a professional rider from 1977 to 1984.  He twice represented West Germany at the Summer Olympics (1972 and 1976), and won the gold medal on both occasions in the Men's Team Pursuit.

Teams 
 1977: Citizen (West Germany)
 1978: Citizen (West Germany)
 1979: Citizen (West Germany)
 1980: Citizen (West Germany)
 1981: Kotter (West Germany)
 1982: Unknown
 1983: Unknown
 1984: Unknown

References

External links

 databaseOlympics

1949 births
Living people
German male cyclists
Cyclists at the 1972 Summer Olympics
Cyclists at the 1976 Summer Olympics
Olympic cyclists of West Germany
Olympic gold medalists for West Germany
Sportspeople from Rostock
Olympic medalists in cycling
Medalists at the 1972 Summer Olympics
Medalists at the 1976 Summer Olympics
German track cyclists
Cyclists from Mecklenburg-Western Pomerania